8 is the eighth studio album by Peruvian singer-songwriter Gian Marco released by EMI on November 17, 2006. It was his first album released under his new label. Three singles were released in order to promote the album with the song No Te Avisa leading the album to a great start by earning Gian Marco multiple awards.

Commercial performance
The album had success in some parts of Latin America but mainly in Perú where it was quickly certified Platinum for 10,000 copies sold. The album got Gian Marco two nominations at the Premios APDAYC in 2007 for Best Pop/Rock Artist of the Year and Best Pop/Rock Song for No Te Avisa winning the latter which since he couldn't make it to the ceremony his mom, actress Regina Alcóver, received on his behalf. No Te Avisa also won the Premios Luces award for Best Pop/Rock Song in 2008.

Track listing
All credits adapted from AllMusic.

Certifications and Sales

Awards and nominations
Premios APDAYC

Premios Luces

References

Gian Marco albums
2006 albums
Spanish-language albums